Edmund Power Flynn (August 19, 1828 in Arichat  Cape Breton, Nova Scotia – January 26, 1900) was a Canadian politician, Richmond County's first coroner and merchant. He was the son of John Flynn b.1789 d.1839 and Mary Power b.1794 d.1849 both born in Dungarvan, Co. Waterford, Ireland. He was elected to the House of Commons of Canada in 1874 as a Member of the Liberal Party for Richmond. He was re-elected in 1878 and 1887. He was defeated in the elections of 1882 and 1891.

He was educated in Cape Breton and became a merchant in Arichat. In 1852, Flynn married Mary Ann Barry (she died in 1862) he then married Ellen Phelan in 1865. He was coroner for Richmond County from 1863 to 1900.

Prior to his federal political experience, he was elected to the Legislative Assembly of Nova Scotia as a Member of the Nova Scotia Liberal Party for Richmond, serving from 1867 to 1874. During his time in the Nova Scotia legislature, he was a Minister without portfolio in the Executive Council of Nova Scotia. He was made Commissioner of Crown Lands in 1871 and served until he resigned from the provincial assembly in 1874 to contest the federal seat.

Flynn was customs collector at Arichat from 1897 until his death there in 1900 at the age of 71.

Electoral record

References

External links
 

1828 births
1900 deaths
Liberal Party of Canada MPs
Members of the House of Commons of Canada from Nova Scotia
Members of the Executive Council of Nova Scotia
Nova Scotia Liberal Party MLAs
Canadian coroners